"Face To Face" is the 21st single by Japanese boy band KAT-TUN. The song "Face To Face" is the theme song for member Kamenashi Kazuya’s movie Ore Ore (It’s Me, It’s Me) which is scheduled to open in theaters on 25 May 2013. This will mark the first time for the group to sing the theme song for a movie.

Single information
The single will be released with three different types; limited edition, first pressed regular edition, and regular edition. Both limited and first pressed regular editions will come with a DVD, and the first pressed regular edition will include a coupling track titled “FLASH“, a solo song by Taguchi Junnosuke. The regular edition will only have a CD, and one of the coupling tracks will be “DRAMATIC” which is the image song for NTV’s live coverage of professional baseball game ‘Dramatic Game 1844′, and is also used as the theme song for NTV’s ‘Going! Sports&News’.

Chart performance
In its first week of its release, the single topped the Oricon singles chart, reportedly selling 131,843 copies. With this single, their number of consecutive singles topping the chart has reached 21, as they’ve been topping the chart since their debut single “Real Face” (released in March 2006).  KAT-TUN placed at no. 16 in the second weeks, reportedly selling 10,546 copies and in the third weeks of its release the single placed at no. 32, reportedly selling 3,491 copies.

By the end of the year, Face To Face was reported by Oricon to sell 150,310 copies and was later certified Gold by RIAJ denoting over 100,000 shipments.

Track listing

Charts

References

External links
 Face To Face product information

KAT-TUN songs
2013 singles
Japanese television drama theme songs
Oricon Weekly number-one singles
2013 songs
Japanese film songs